Sheikh Bhikhari Medical College (earlier name Hazaribag Medical College) is a full-fledged tertiary referral Government Medical college. It was established in the year 2019. The college imparts the degree Bachelor of Medicine and Surgery course (MBBS).

Geography

Location

About College
The college is affiliated to Vinoba Bhave University and is recognised by Medical Council of India. The hospital associated with the college is one of the largest hospitals in the Hazaribag district. The selection to the college is done on the basis of merit through National Eligibility and Entrance Test. Yearly undergraduate student intake is 100 from the year 2019.

Courses
Sheikh Bhikhari Medical College undertakes education and training of students MBBS courses.

See also

References

External links 
 Hazaribag Medical College

Medical colleges in Jharkhand
Colleges affiliated to Vinoba Bhave University
Educational institutions established in 2019
2019 establishments in Jharkhand
Universities and colleges in Jharkhand
Hazaribagh